Ricardo Forster (born 26 September 1957) is an Argentine philosopher, historian of ideas and political critic.

He is professor and researcher at Universidad de Buenos Aires and University of Maryland. He is also member of the editorial board of Pensamiento de los Confines magazine. Along with Horacio Verbitsky, Nicolás Casullo and others created Espacio Carta Abierta ("Open Letter Spot"), a propagandistic group in defense of the Kirchner government, in 2008, after an attempt to raise taxes on agricultural exports led to large street protests.

He also had a small incursion in television as presenter of "Grandes pensadores del siglo XX" ("Greatest thinkers of 20th-century") in Encuentro, in years 2009–2010.

In 2013, he ran for a seat in the Chamber of Deputies. He was fourth on the Front for Victory list, which came in third place with less than 22% of the vote, not enough for Forster to be elected.

In June 2014, the position of "Secretary of Strategic Coordination of National Thought" was created by the Kirchner administration and Forster was named its first office holder. The Secretary was given the task to "design, coordinate and instrument a factory of National Thought" and its creation and Forster's naming were criticised by the opposition but applauded by Carta Abierta.

Forster is also an essayist and writer. In his works he develops his thinking on diverse subjects, which include political philosophy, nihilism, the entire concept of essay (topic of his doctoral dissertation), and social sciences in general.

Selected bibliography
 W. Benjamin – Th. W. Adorno, el ensayo como filosofía. Buenos Aires: Nueva Visión, 1991. 
 Itinerarios de la Modernidad (junto a Nicolás Casullo y Alejandro Kaufman). Buenos Aires: Eudeba, 1996. 
 El exilio de la palabra. Ensayos en torno a lo judío. Buenos Aires: Lom, 1997. 
 Walter Benjamin y el problema del mal. Buenos Aires: Altamira, 2003. 
 Crítica y sospecha. Los claroscuros de la cultura moderna. Buenos Aires: Paidós, 2003. 
 Mesianismo, nihilismo y redención (junto a Diego Tatián). Buenos Aires: Altamira, 2005. 
 Notas sobre la barbarie y la esperanza. Del 11 de septiembre a la crisis argentina. Buenos Aires: Biblos, 2006. 
 El laberinto de las voces argentinas. Ensayos políticos. Buenos Aires: Colihue, 2008.  
 Los hermeneutas de la noche. De Walter Benjamin a Paul Celan. Buenos Aires: Trotta, 2009. 
 Benjamin. Una introducción. Buenos Aires: Quadrata/Biblioteca Nacional, 2009. 
 La anomalía Argentina. Buenos Aires: Sudamericana, 2010. 
 La muerte del héroe. Buenos Aires: Ariel, 2011. 
 El litigio por la democracia. Buenos Aires: Planeta, 2011.

References

External links
 La guerra, Israel y ser judío 
 YOK ENTREVISTA – Ricardo Forster (parte 1)  

1957 births
Argentine essayists
Male essayists
Argentine male novelists
Argentine educators
Argentine philosophers
Kirchnerism
Living people
Jewish Argentine politicians
Jewish Argentine writers
Historians of philosophy
Political philosophers
Members of Carta Abierta